Chucuito is a village in the Chucuito District, Puno Province, Peru. The population is 7,913.

The town was important in pre-Inca times and described by Pedro De Cieza De Leon, who was told by the locals that Chucuito was the oldest site in the region and continued to be held as a sacred site by the Inca. The town previously consisted of large buildings and was a major center of power.

Gallery

References

External links

Populated places in the Puno Region
Populated places on Lake Titicaca
Populated lakeshore places in Peru